Billinudgel is a town in the Northern Rivers region of New South Wales, Australia, and is part of Byron Shire. It used to be a railway town with many fruit and vegetables loaded onto the local railway.  Since the railway is no longer used in Billinudgel, it has nearly joined to the nearby town of Ocean Shores. The area was bypassed by a heavily upgraded Pacific Highway in July 2007, home to the NSW RFS Billinudgel/Ocean Shores Brigade from 1976.

Climate 
Billinudgel has a mild climate with winter frosts and warm wet summers.

Name 
The name Billinudgel is derived from Bundjalung Bilihnadhihl, meaning "once belonged to a parrot".

Gallery

References

Towns in New South Wales
Northern Rivers